Adams Mill Covered Bridge is located in Indiana south of State Road 18 and north of State Road 26, 1/2 mile East of Cutler to County road 50 East, north on 50 East 1/2 mile.

History
John Adams was an early settler, moving to Carroll County, Indiana, in 1831. There he settled, finishing construction of his Adams Mill in 1845. In June 1871, the Carroll County Commissioners approved petitions requesting that two bridges be built over Wildcat Creek. Adams Mill Bridge was built in 1872 by the Wheelock Bridge Company. Both bridges were completed for a total cost of $12,237.33.

In 1870 Richard Loman and others petitioned for a covered bridge to be built across the Wild Cat Creek, and the proposal was approved in 1871. The bridge used a Howe truss system. About 1900, the bridge was modified with the addition of Burr arches to increase the load the bridge could carry. By 1957 the bridge's condition had worsened to the point that a local history group began a fundraising campaign for it. The bridge was closed to vehicles in 1974 because of its condition. In 1978, the bridge suffered from severe vandalism. In 1992 Friends of Adams Mill Valley, Inc., was formed to again raise money for the bridge's care. The group received a grant for $291,000. In addition, the group raised $85,000 by 1999 and given to the county to receive a 20% matching grant. In the mid-1990s, bikes and foot-traffic were also banned. Finally, in 1999 the Kaser-Spraker Construction Co. started restoring the bridge. On October 9, 1999, it was reopened. The project cost $686,000.

Today
In 1996, Adams Mill Covered Bridge was added to the National Register of Historic Places. 
In 1998 the Friends of Adams Mill Valley, Inc., made a deal with Kaser-Spraker Inc. of South Bend, Indiana, in the amount of $545,932.00 for restoration.
On Oct. 9, 1999 restoration was complete and the bridge was reopened.

References

External links

Unofficial Adams Mill Bridge Website
Kaser-Spraker Construction Inc.
Adams Mill Bridge on The National Register of Historic Places

National Register of Historic Places in Carroll County, Indiana
Bridges completed in 1872
Covered bridges on the National Register of Historic Places in Indiana
Transportation buildings and structures in Carroll County, Indiana
Tourist attractions in Carroll County, Indiana
Road bridges on the National Register of Historic Places in Indiana
1872 establishments in Indiana
Wooden bridges in Indiana
Burr Truss bridges in the United States
Howe truss bridges in the United States